The Pilyuda is a river in Irkutsk Oblast, Russia.

The river flows across an uninhabited area of the Kirensky District. Orlova village is located by the left bank, near the confluence with the Lena.

Course  
The Pilyuda is a left tributary of the Lena. It has its sources in the Lena Plateau and flows at its southwestern limit. To the west of its basin the Lower Tunguska of the Yenisey basin, flows northwards. The Pilyuda heads in a roughly southern direction across a taiga area of low, smooth hills.

The river freezes yearly between October and May.

See also
List of rivers of Russia

References

External links 
Pilyunda At Orlovo

Central Siberian Plateau
Rivers of Irkutsk Oblast